The East Hanover School District is a community public school district that serves students in pre-kindergarten through eighth grade from East Hanover, in Morris County, New Jersey, United States.

As of the 2020-21 school year, the district, comprising three schools, had an enrollment of 908 students and 94.8 classroom teachers (on an FTE basis), for a student–teacher ratio of 9.6:1.

In 2020, the district was classified as a high performing school according to the State Department of Education's NJQSAC monitoring process.

The district is classified by the New Jersey Department of Education as being in District Factor Group "GH", the third-highest of eight groupings. District Factor Groups organize districts statewide to allow comparison by common socioeconomic characteristics of the local districts. From lowest socioeconomic status to highest, the categories are A, B, CD, DE, FG, GH, I and J.

Students in ninth through twelfth grades for public school are served by the Hanover Park Regional High School District, attending Hanover Park High School in East Hanover, together with students from Florham Park. The district also serves students from the neighboring community of Hanover Township at Whippany Park High School in the Whippany section of Hanover Township. As of the 2018–19 school year, the high school had an enrollment of 642 students and 58.4 classroom teachers (on an FTE basis), for a student–teacher ratio of 11.0:1.

Schools
The schools in the district (with 2018–19 enrollment data from the National Center for Education Statistics) are:
Elementary schools
Frank J. Smith Elementary School with 322 students in grades PreK-2
Kristen D'Anna, Principal
Central Elementary School with 289 students in grades 3-5
Melissa V. Falcone, Principal
Middle school
East Hanover Middle School with 289 students in grades 6-8
Stacie Costello, Principal

Administration
Core members of the district's administration are:
Natalee Vaccaro Bartlett, Superintendent
Carol Delsandro, Business Administrator / Board Secretary

Board of education
The district's board of education, with seven members, sets policy and oversees the fiscal and educational operation of the district through its administration. As a Type II school district, the board's trustees are elected directly by voters to serve three-year terms of office on a staggered basis, with either two or three seats up for election each year held (since 2012) as part of the November general election. The board appoints a superintendent to oversee the day-to-day operation of the district.

References

External links
East Hanover School District
 
School Data for the East Hanover School District, National Center for Education Statistics
Hanover Park High School
Hanover Park Regional High School District

East Hanover Township, New Jersey
New Jersey District Factor Group GH
School districts in Morris County, New Jersey